Vigneulles-lès-Hattonchâtel (literally Vigneulles near Hattonchâtel) is a commune in the Meuse department in Grand Est in north-eastern France.

The former towns of Billy-sous-les-Côtes, Creuë, Hattonchâtel, Hattonville, Saint-Benoît-en-Woëvre, and Viéville-sous-les-Côtes were joined to Vigneulles-lès-Hattonchâtel on 1 March 1973.

Gallery

See also
 Château de Hattonchâtel
 Communes of the Meuse department
Parc naturel régional de Lorraine

References

Vigneullesleshattonchatel